In molecular biology, Caf1 capsule antigen proteins are a family of the F1 capsule antigens Caf1 synthesised by Yersinia bacteria. They adopt a structure consisting of a seven strands arranged in two beta-sheets, in a Greek-key topology, and mediate targeting of the bacterium to sites of infection.

References

Protein domains